Fibrocalculous pancreatopathy (FCPP) is a secondary form of diabetes mellitus of unresolved etiology that has historically been considered an issue specific to the impoverished agricultural tropics of India, but also occurs in the countries of Bangladesh, China, and Ethiopia.

See also 
 Climatic regions of India
 Diseases of poverty
 Poverty in China
 Poverty in India

References

Further reading 
 

Diabetes